Kelebogile Emily Kerileng is a South African politician currently serving as a Member of the North West Provincial Legislature for the Economic Freedom Fighters. She was elected to the legislature in May 2019.

References

Living people
Year of birth missing (living people)
Tswana people
Economic Freedom Fighters politicians
Members of the North West Provincial Legislature